Havana is an unincorporated community in Hale County, Alabama, United States.

Demographics

Havana was listed on the 1880 U.S. Census as an unincorporated community with a population of 137. It was the only time it was listed on the census rolls.

Notable people
 J.B. Elliott, forecaster at the National Weather Service in Birmingham, Alabama, from 1957 to 1989
 Joseph Neely Powers, chancellor of the University of Mississippi from 1914 to 1924, and from 1930 to 1932
 Henry Tutwiler, 19th century founder of the Greene Springs School for Boys just outside Havana
 Julia Tutwiler, 19th century education and prison reform advocate

References

Unincorporated communities in Hale County, Alabama
Unincorporated communities in Alabama